Giorgi was a Georgian royal prince (batonishvili) of the Bagrationi dynasty and co-king of Georgia from 1408 to 1412.

Prince George was the third son of King Constantine I of Georgia and his wife Natia Khurtsidze.

In 1434, he married Gulashar (Gulkhan) of Imereti and had son Bagrat VI of Georgia.

After his death which was between 1435 and 1446, his widow wife married his nephew the Prince Demetrius.

References

ჩხატარაიშვილი ქ., ქართული საბჭოთა ენციკლოპედია, ტ. 2, გვ. 130, თბ., 1977 წელი.
ივ., ჯავახიშვილი, ქართველი ერის ისტორია, ტ. III, თბ., 1966 წ. გვ. 424-423
Cyrille Toumanoff, Les dynasties de la Caucasie chrétienne de l'Antiquité jusqu'au XIXe siècle: Tables généalogiques et chronologiques, Rome, 1990, p. 139-140.
Alexandre Manvelishvili, Histoire de la Géorgie, Paris, Nouvelles Éditions de la Toison d'Or, 1951, 476 p., p. 254.

Bagrationi dynasty of the Kingdom of Georgia
Georgian princes
15th-century people from Georgia (country)